Nuka Taipari (?–8 November 1863) was a notable New Zealand tribal leader, warrior and tohunga. Of Māori descent, he identified with the Ngai Te Rangi iwi.

References

1863 deaths
Ngāi Te Rangi people
Tohunga
New Zealand Māori religious leaders
Year of birth unknown